It's a Lifestyle TV is an Australian lifestyle television series that airs on Network Ten at 4 pm, it debuted on the 12th of October, 2013. It's hosted by Chef Dominique Rizzo who was also featured on the Australian cooking show Ready Steady Cook as one of the many chefs.

Network 10 original programming
Australian cooking television series
2013 Australian television series debuts